Posad is a rural locality (a village) in Vereshchaginsky District, Perm Krai, Russia. The population was 45 as of 2010. There is 1 street.

Geography 
Posad is located 20 km west of Vereshchagino (the district's administrative centre) by road. Zapolye is the nearest rural locality.

References 

Rural localities in Vereshchaginsky District